"Crying in the Rain" is a song by the English hard rock band Whitesnake. The song was originally released on the group's 1982 album Saints & Sinners, but was re-recorded on the group's 1987 multi-platinum album Whitesnake. The song was inspired by singer David Coverdale's divorce.

Overview
The original version of "Crying in the Rain" is very blues-based and features a short guitar solo at the beginning played by Bernie Marsden. The original song also has a bit slower tempo compared to the re-recorded version, which had a much heavier and faster sound, influenced by heavy metal. The guitar solo at the beginning of the original was also removed from this version. David Coverdale has stated in interviews that "John (Sykes) hated blues".

The re-recorded version (sometimes titled "Crying in the Rain '87") was also released as a one-track promo single.

The song has been a part of Whitesnake's live performances since its release in 1982, although it is the 1987 version that Whitesnake has kept performing, since 1987. Also, since Whitesnake's reformation in 2002, the song has been extended by a drum solo in the middle of the song.

Personnel

Original version
 David Coverdale – Lead vocals
 Micky Moody - Guitars, backing vocals
 Bernie Marsden – Guitars
 Jon Lord - Keyboards
 Neil Murray – Bass
 Ian Paice – Drums
 Mel Galley – Backing vocals

Re-recorded version

 David Coverdale – Lead vocals
 John Sykes – Guitars, backing vocals
 Neil Murray – Bass
 Aynsley Dunbar – Drums, percussion
 Don Airey – Keyboards
 Bill Cuomo – Keyboards

References 

Songs about weather
Songs about divorce
1982 songs
1988 singles
Whitesnake songs
Songs written by David Coverdale
Song recordings produced by Keith Olsen
Song recordings produced by Mike Stone (record producer)
Song recordings produced by Martin Birch
Geffen Records singles
Blues songs

es:Crying in the Rain